Matthew William Santangelo (born September 8, 1977) is an American–Italian former professional basketball player. He played college basketball at Gonzaga University.

With the USA men's basketball team he won a gold medal at the 1999 World University Games in Palma de Mallorca, Spain.

External links
ACB.com Profile
Legabasket.it Profile
Eurobasket.com Profile

1977 births
Living people
American expatriate basketball people in Greece
American expatriate basketball people in Italy
American expatriate basketball people in Poland
American expatriate basketball people in Spain
American men's basketball players
Basketball players from Portland, Oregon
Central Catholic High School (Portland, Oregon) alumni
Gonzaga Bulldogs men's basketball players
Iraklis Thessaloniki B.C. players
KK Włocławek players
Liga ACB players
Medalists at the 1999 Summer Universiade
Pallacanestro Cantù players
Pallacanestro Treviso players
Point guards
Real Betis Baloncesto players
Universiade gold medalists for the United States
Universiade medalists in basketball